Linn Haug (born 6 March 1990) is a Norwegian snowboarder from Trondheim, Norway. She has been riding a snowboard for most of her life, but she only started competing at the age of 15. She married on December 31, 2013.

Awards
 Rookie of the year, Norwegian Snowboard Awards, 2006
 Nominated female rider of the year, Norwegian Snowboard Awards, 2007, 2008 and 2009

Results

2009 
 4th Burton European Open Halfpipe
 4th Chicken Jam Halfpipe, Mammoth
 4th Snow Angels Halfpipe, Snowmass
 4th New Zealand Open Halfpipe
 7th World Cup Halfpipe, Vancouver
 9th World Cup Halfpipe, Bardonecchia

2008 
 1st European Cup Halfpipe, Saas Fee
 1st Swag Pipe Jam, Norway
 3rd, World Championship, Juniors, Halfpipe
 3rd World Cup Halfpipe, New Zealand
 5th Burton European Open Halfpipe
 6th World Cup Halfpipe, Bardonecchia
 6th World Cup Finals, Valmalenco

2007 
 1st, Norwegian Championship, Halfpipe
 3rd Paul Mitchell Quarterpipe, Lake Placid
 6th World Cup Halfpipe, New Zealand
 10th US Grand Prix Halfpipe, Tamarack
 Overall winner Burton Glory Daze Tour Slopestyle, Norway

2006 
 1st, Norwegian Championship, Slopestyle
 1st Norwegian Cup Halfpipe
 Overall winner Burton Glory Daze Tour Slopestyle, Norway

2005 
 1st, Norwegian Championship, Halfpipe
 1st, Norwegian Championship, Slopestyle

2010 Olympics
Haug represented Norway at the 2010 Winter Olympics in Vancouver for the halfpipe events.

References

External links
 

1990 births
Living people
Sportspeople from Trondheim
Norwegian female snowboarders
Olympic snowboarders of Norway
Snowboarders at the 2010 Winter Olympics
21st-century Norwegian women